The Spirit of Capricorn was a long distance passenger rail service in Queensland, Australia, Operated by Queensland Rail between 1988 and 24 May 2003. It operated between Rockhampton, Queensland and the Capital of the state, Brisbane at its station Roma Street.

Route 
Commencing in 1988, the route was same as the Capricornian which had been suspended from overnight services the following year. This was because of the introduction of the Spirit of Capricorn which actually used the new InterCity Express multiple unit trains. The route ran from Roma Street Station to Rockhampton Station via many stations including Nambour, Gympie North, Bundaberg and Gladstone. In 1993, The Capricornian was merged with the Midlander to form the Spirit of the Outback which ran all the way to Longreach Railway Station. Due to this, the Spirit of Capricorn became the only train operating directly between Rockhampton and Brisbane thus removing all competition.

Demise 
In 1998, Queensland Rail introduced the Electric Tilt Train service which ran between the Rockhampton and Brisbane and greatly reduced travel due to its 160 km/h (99 mph) operating speed which by far was superior to the Spirit of Capricorn's I.C.E carriages. Due to this, the Spirit of Capricorn services were reduced to once a week.

Finally with the introduction of the Diesel Tilt Train service in 2003, the Spirit of Capricorn was suspended and made its last on 24 May. The InterCity Express trains were then used on the Sunshine Coast Line. As of November 2021, all of them have been retired from service.

References

See also 
 InterCity Express (Queensland Rail)
 Capricornian

Rail transport in Queensland